The 1872 California-Nevada State Boundary Marker marks the initial point for the 1872 survey delineation of the state line between California and Nevada. It is listed in the National Register of Historic Places.

History

When California attained statehood in 1850, it adopted 120 degrees west longitude as its eastern border. Between 1855 and 1900 there were six surveys to locate 120 degrees, with each locating 120 degrees of longitude differently. In 1872, Alexey W. Von Schmidt undertook the survey of the state line. He marked his survey line with stones, wood, and iron markers; the only one who placed such markers A new survey in 1893 showed that the Von Schmidt line was 1,600 to 1,800 feet west of the actual 120 degrees. However, California and Nevada both recognize the 1872 Von Schmidt survey and the 1893 survey as the state line.
Google maps shows that the Verdi CA/NV boundary marker, located at lat/long 39.52451/-120.00186, is approximately 525 feet west of 120 degrees longitude.

The 1872 marker near Verdi, Nevada is a four-sided cast iron pylon eight feet tall. It includes the words "CALIFORNIA" on the west face of the pylon, "NEVADA" on the east face, "1872, LONGITUDE 120 WEST OF GREENWICH, A.W. VON SCHMIDT, U.S." on the south face, and "170 MILES 47 CHAINS TO OREGON" on the north face. The marker is surrounded by a wrought iron fence.

The marker was listed in the National Register of Historic Places because it represents the initial point of survey for the California-Nevada border, and is a remnant of this survey.

NGS gives current data for another 1872 marker that may still exist at the northeast corner of California.

See also

List of National Historic Landmarks in Nevada
National Register of Historic Places listings in Washoe County, Nevada
Constitutional Convention (California)
Compromise of 1850
California Constitution
Utah Territory
Organic Act
California and Nevada Border Dispute
Coast and Geodetic Survey Granite Boundary Monument No. 1 (circa 1894) - South Lake Tahoe

References

Initial points
Historic surveying landmarks in the United States
History of Sierra County, California
Monuments and memorials on the National Register of Historic Places in California
National Register of Historic Places in Washoe County, Nevada
1872 in California
National Register of Historic Places in Sierra County, California
Monuments and memorials on the National Register of Historic Places in Nevada